Zacarías Gómez Urquiza (1905-1982) was a Mexican film director and screenwriter.

Selected filmography
 Jesusita en Chihuahua (film) (1942)
 Mischievous Susana (1945)
 We Maids (1951)
 The Masked Tiger (1951)
 The Mystery of the Express Car (1953)
 The Sin of Being a Woman (1955)
 Happiness (1957, co-writer only)
 Northern Courier (1960)
 El tesoro de Morgan (1974)
 Viento salvaje (1974)

References

Bibliography 
 Joanne Hershfield & David R. Maciel. Mexico's Cinema: A Century of Film and Filmmakers. Rowman & Littlefield Publishers, 1999.

External links 
 

1905 births
1982 deaths
Mexican film directors
Mexican screenwriters